The 1908 UCI Track Cycling World Championships were the World Championship for track cycling. They took place in Berlin for professionals and in Leipzig for amateurs in Germany from 26 July to 2 August 1908. Four events for men were contested, two for professionals and two for amateurs.

Medal summary

Medal table

References

Track cycling
UCI Track Cycling World Championships by year
International cycle races hosted by Germany
Sports competitions in Berlin
Sports competitions in Leipzig
1908 in track cycling